The 1867 Vermont gubernatorial election took place on September 3, 1867. In keeping with the "Mountain Rule", incumbent Republican Paul Dillingham was not a candidate for another term as governor of Vermont.  The Republican nomination was won by John B. Page, who had previously served as Vermont State Treasurer.  The Democratic nomination was won by John L. Edwards of Newport, who had previously served as State's Attorney of Orleans County.  In the general election, Page was elected to a one-year term as governor.

Results

References

Vermont
1867
Gubernatorial
September 1867 events